Diapleuridae is a family of five extinct species of marine glass sponges found in the Caribbean Sea, Florida Straits, Banda Sea, and US Virgin Islands. A sixth species–Diapleura hatoni–is postulated to have existed around the same time as the other five, but there is limited research on it. Diapleuridae is part of class Hexactinellida and order Lyssacinosida. These sponges lived during the Middle Epoch of the Eocene and were filter feeders that were attached to the benthos by a basal disc. The oldest recorded fossil of a species of Diapluridae is from 47.8 million years ago, with the most recent fossil dated 41.3 million years ago.

Ecology 

These species lived on the benthos of the ocean in the epipelagic, between about 200 and 500 meters in depth. The individual sponge is roughly 30mm in height and 25mm in width, surrounded by a silica coating that creates the “glass” exterior. All species of this family were suspension feeders, primarily feeding on plankton and other suspended materials. As with all Porifera, Diaplueridae are thought to have consisted of a group of protists similar in nature to choanoflagellates within their central cavity to produce water currents that bring nutrient-rich water into the sponge to feed. Electrical currents are sent through the soft tissue of the sponge in replacement of a nerve structure. 

Hexactinellida reproduction is asexual, although not much is known about how it works. Sperm is brought into the body cavity via water flow where it then fertilizes the egg. The resulting larvae differ from other sponges because they lack a flagella, making them sessile. The eggs are incubated and form spicules when they are released into the water column. The spiculed larvae settle in high densities on the ocean floor and grow to form the adult sponge.

The sponge is firmly within class Hexactinellida–hexa meaning six and is attributed to the six (and occasionally four) silica spicules that make up the sponge's skeleton, as well as its “triaxonic symmetry.” Hexactinellida are different from other classes of sponges because of their more diverse set of morphological characteristic and complex skeletal structure. This class has an array of spicule types that vary among specific species. Most of what is known about these species comes from the knowledge of their class and order. Class Lyssacinoside is characterized by either their unfused spicules as adults or an atypical spicule framework.

The species Coronispongia confossa are indigenous to their region and live between the middle and outer edges of shallow-water carbonate ramps with heterogeneous substrates. Along with this specific species, all five (and potentially six) species of Diaplueridae are autochthonous, although modes of attachment and depth as well as location of each sponge species varies. Today there are roughly 500 species of sponges under the class Hexactinellida which vary between 200 and 2,000 meters in depth, although no species of Diapleuridae remains.

As to the makeup of the family, Scleroplegma maasi, one species of Diapleuridae, has “ridge-like tracts” of the skeleton running vertically about the fossil. The sponge has a smooth gastral cavity that varies in thickness. The skeleton consists of a “gastral-skeletal” with branching ridges surrounding it. The branches form a net-like structure of funnel-like calyxes. The excurrent and incurrent parts of the sponge are thought to be formed through the same tubule–unlike other species within the genus where both tubules are distinctly separate–and are thought to be the cause of the gaps within the tube wall of the sponge.

Research 
Few expeditions have been done on Diapleuridae sponges, which attribute to the lack of information about the family. The first recorded study was done by a German scientist in the Caribbean Sea and US Virgin Islands in the late 1870s. Oscar Schmidt studied and coined two of the six species, Scleroplegma lanterna and Scleroplegma herculeum in 1879 and 1880 respectively. During his study, he noted the rough texture of the fossils as well as the conical shape of the species. The most intensive research was carried out by Isao Ijimi in the 1920s on his cruise of the Caribbean Sea, his published works culminated in his book The Hexactinellida of the Siboga Expedition which was published in 1927. More recent work using museum samples includes that of Vivianna Frisone and her team during 2016 in Italy, where the species Coronispongia confossa was both identified and studied.

References

Sponges